José Luis Pérez (born 18 June 1943) is a Mexican equestrian. He was born in Tonalá, Jalisco. He won a bronze medal in team eventing at the 1980 Summer Olympics in Moscow. He also competed at the 1976 Summer Olympics.

References

1943 births
Living people
Sportspeople from Jalisco
Mexican male equestrians
Olympic equestrians of Mexico
Olympic bronze medalists for Mexico
Equestrians at the 1976 Summer Olympics
Equestrians at the 1980 Summer Olympics
Olympic medalists in equestrian
Medalists at the 1980 Summer Olympics
20th-century Mexican people
21st-century Mexican people